Bow Valley is an unincorporated community and census-designated place in Cedar County, Nebraska, United States. As of the 2010 census it had a population of 116.

Geography
Bow Valley is located in northern Cedar County, in the valley of West Bow Creek, a tributary of the Missouri River. Nebraska Highway 12 passes one mile north of the community, leading east  to Ponca and west  to Crofton. Nebraska Highway 57 passes a mile west of Bow Valley, leading south  to Hartington.

Demographics

History
A post office was established at Bow Valley in 1871, and remained in operation until it was discontinued in 1907. The community takes its name from Bow Valley.

References

Census-designated places in Nebraska
Census-designated places in Cedar County, Nebraska